In algebraic geometry, the smooth topology is a certain Grothendieck topology, which is finer than étale topology. Its main use is to define the cohomology of an algebraic stack with coefficients in, say, the étale sheaf .

Then  in the étale topology; i.e., just a point. Thus, the cohomology of  should be defined using smooth topology for formulae like Behrend's fixed point formula to hold.

Notes

References 

 Unfortunately this book uses the incorrect assertion  that morphisms of algebraic stacks induce morphisms of lisse-étale topoi.

Algebraic geometry